Christopher B. Field is an American scientist and researcher, who has contributed to the field of climate change. The author of more than 200 scientific publications, Field's research emphasizes impacts of climate change, from the molecular to the global scale. His work includes major field experiments on responses of California grassland to multi-factor global change, integrative studies on the global carbon cycle, and assessments of impacts of climate change on agriculture. Field's work with models includes studies on the global distribution of carbon sources and sinks, and studies on environmental consequences of expanding biomass energy.

Positions and accolades
Field is the founding director of the Carnegie Institution's Department of Global Ecology. Field received his PhD from Stanford University in 1981 and has been at the Carnegie Institution for Science since 1984. Field is also a Professor of Biology and Environmental Earth System Science at Stanford University, the Faculty Director of Stanford's Jasper Ridge Biological Preserve, and a member of the US National Academy of Sciences. He was a coordinating lead author for the fourth assessment report of the Intergovernmental Panel on Climate Change. Field has testified before House and Senate committees and has appeared on media from NPR's “Science Friday” to BBC's “Your World Today.” In September 2008, Field was elected co-chair of Working Group 2 of the IPCC, along with Vicente Barros. In 2009, Field was one of ten recipients of the 15th Annual Heinz Award with special focus on the environment.

Also Field received the 2013 BBVA Foundation Frontiers of Knowledge Award in Climate Change for discovering the importance of ecosystems and their effective management in the battle against climate change. Field's work has allowed to quantify the global climate impact of deforestation, agriculture and other changes in vegetation cover. And vice versa. It has helped predict how climate change will impact on land ecosystems. For 2022 he was awarded the Japan Prize in the category "Biological Production, Ecology/Environment".

Field currently serves as a co-chair of Intergovernmental Panel on Climate Change's "Working Group II, impacts, adaptation, vulnerability."    In February 2015, the US State Department announced his candidacy to be IPCC Chair.

Field Lab 
Chris Field's lab at Carnegie Science focuses on ecological research from the ecosystem- to the global scale. Much of the work emphasizes understanding drivers and impacts of global environmental change on various ecosystems, including grasslands and oceans. The Field Lab is also currently working on biomass energy production.

People 
Former notable Ph.D. students that Chris Field advised are:
 Christa Anderson, Ph.D.
 Grayson Badgley, Ph.D.
 Rebecca R. Hernandez, Ph.D.
 Kelly McManus Chauvin, Ph.D.

Former notable postdoctoral scholars that Chris Field advised are:
 Katharine J. Mach, Ph.D.
 Charlotte Stanton, Ph.D.
 Peter Turner, Ph.D

References

Plant physiologists
Climate activists
Living people
Botanists active in California
Members of the United States National Academy of Sciences
Stanford University faculty
Scientists from California
American environmentalists
20th-century American botanists
21st-century American botanists
Fellows of the Ecological Society of America
Year of birth missing (living people)